Mauritian passports are issued to citizens of Mauritius for travel outside the country. , Mauritius' Passport and Immigration Office processed an average of 434 passport applications each day.

Legal basis

Mauritian passports are issued under the Passport Act of 14 February 1969. The Passport Regulations 1969 govern details of their issuance. The regulations make provision for extending the period of validity of a passport; however, after a passport is expired, there is no provision for renewal, and instead a new application must be made to the Passport and Immigration Office.

Physical appearance

Mauritian passports issued to adult citizens are navy blue in colour, with the Coat of arms of Mauritius emblazoned in the centre of the front cover. The word "Passport" is inscribed below the coat of arms, and "Republic of Mauritius" above.  The passport contains 64 visa pages.

Identity information page

The Mauritian passport includes the following data:

 Photo of passport Holder
 Type P
 Code of Issuing State (MUS)
 Passport No.
 Surname
 Given Names
 Profession
 Nationality
 Date of birth
 Sex
 Date of issue
 Date of expiry
 Personal No.
 Place of birth
 Authority
 Holder's Signature

The information page ends with the Machine Readable Passport Zone.

Passport note

The passports contain a note from the issuing state that is addressed to the authorities of all other states, identifying the bearer as a citizen of that state and requesting that he or she be allowed to pass and be treated according to international norms.  The note inside Mauritian passports states:

In English:

The President of the Republic of Mauritius requests and requires all those whom it may concern to allow the bearer to pass freely without let or hindrance, and to afford such assistance and protection as may be necessary.

and in French:

Le Président de la Republique de Maurice requiert de laisser passer le titulaire librement et sans empêchement et de lui fournir toute assistance et protection si nécessaire.

Languages

The data page/information page is printed in both English and French.

Visa requirements

As of 26 March 2019, Mauritian citizens had visa-free or visa on arrival access to 145 countries and territories, ranking the Mauritian passport 31st (tied with Saint Lucia) in terms of travel freedom accordant to the Henley visa restrictions index.

See also

Visa requirements for Mauritian citizens
List of passports

References

External links
Debriefing Session on Signature of EU Visa Waiver Agreement 
Permitted durations of stay for visa-free travel are based on the Delta Travel Planner unless otherwise indicated

Mauritius and the Commonwealth of Nations
Passports by country
Law of Mauritius